International Board may refer to:

 International Football Association Board, association football governing body
 International Rugby League Board, defunct rugby league football governing body